James Moran may refer to:

Politics and law
 James Moran (diplomat) (fl. 2012–2016), British diplomat; ambassador of the European Union to Egypt
 James Moran (Irish politician) (died 1938), Irish politician
 James Byron Moran (1930–2009), U.S. federal judge
 James G. Moran (1870–1941), American politician in Massachusetts
 Jim Moran (born 1945), U.S. Congressman from Virginia

Sports
 James Moran Sr. (1912–1983), American football guard
 James Moran (American football) (1921–2005), American football coach at King's College
 Jim Moran (basketball) (born 1978), American professional basketball player
 Jim Moran (boxer) (1963–2021), British boxer
 Jim Moran (skier) (born 1972), American Olympic skier

Others
 James Moran (shipbuilder) (fl. 1805–1856), Canadian shipbuilder
 James Moran (writer) (born 1972), British screenwriter
 James Michael Moran (born 1943), American radio astronomer
 Jim Moran (businessman) (1918–2007), American auto dealer and philanthropist
 Jim Moran (publicist) (1908–1999), American publicist and press agent

See also
Jimmy Moran (disambiguation)